Robert John Keyes (18 December 1942 – 8 September 2022) was an Australian rugby league footballer who played in the 1960s and 1970s.

Playing career
Keyes was an Easts junior who played five first grade games with Eastern Suburbs 1960–61 then signed with Newtown. 

Keyes joined Newtown in 1962 and formed a long-standing and successful centre partnership with Brian 'Chicka' Moore until he retired in 1970. 

Keyes also captained Newtown during his career and was also a representative player with New South Wales in 1964. He took the Newtown reserve grade team to the premiership in 1970 and then retired to the Second Division competition at the Ryde-Eastwood club.

Keyes was publican at Fortune of War Hotel, Millers Point, New South Wales.

References

1942 births
2022 deaths
Newtown Jets players
Australian rugby league players
New South Wales rugby league team players
Rugby league centres